The 1965 Invercargill mayoral election was part of the New Zealand local elections held that same year. The polling was conducted using the standard first-past-the-post electoral method. Incumbent mayor Neil Watson was re-elected with an increased majority, defeating deputy mayor Clive Faul.

Results
The following table gives the election results:

References

1965 elections in New Zealand
Mayoral elections in Invercargill
October 1965 events in New Zealand